Kremnitz may refer to:

Kremnitz (Kronach), river in Bavaria, Germany
Mite Kremnitz (1852–1916), German-Romanian writer
Kremenets, a city in Ukraine